William Russell "Red" Rollings (March 31, 1904 – December 31, 1964) was a reserve infielder in Major League Baseball who played from  through  for the Boston Red Sox (1927–1928) and Boston Braves (1930). He was born in Mobile, Alabama.

In a three-season career, Rollings was a .251 hitter (89-for-355) with 36 runs and 28 runs batted in in 184 games, including 13 doubles, two triples, five stolen bases, and a .311 on-base percentage with no home runs.

Rollings died at the age of 60 in his hometown of Mobile, Alabama.

External links

Retrosheet

Major League Baseball infielders
Boston Braves players
Boston Red Sox players
Minor league baseball managers
Baseball players from Alabama
Sportspeople from Mobile, Alabama
1904 births
1964 deaths
Mobile Bears players
Fort Worth Panthers players
Hollywood Stars players
Columbus Red Birds players
Houston Buffaloes players
Rochester Red Wings players
Denver Bears players
Atlanta Crackers players
Kansas City Blues (baseball) players
Tulsa Oilers (baseball) players
Louisville Colonels (minor league) players
Tyler Trojans players
Dayton Ducks players
Pine Bluff Judges players
Salina Millers players
Laurel Lumberjacks players